The 1975 South Pacific Games was the fifth edition where football was played and was held in Guam during August 1975.

Group stage

Group 1

Group 2

Semi finals

Bronze medal match

Gold medal match

External links
Details on RSSSF website

Football at the Pacific Games
Pac
P
1975 Pacific Games
South